Torremolinos is a municipality in Andalusia, southern Spain, west of Málaga. A poor fishing village before the growth in tourism began in the late 1950s, Torremolinos was the first of the Costa del Sol resorts to be developed and is still the most popular in the region.

On the western shore of the Bay of Málaga and in front of the Sierra de Mijas  from Málaga, it is served by the A-7 motorway, which bypasses the city to the north, the Cercanías commuter train and Avanzabus.

In 2013, it had 69,389 inhabitants, making it the sixth largest city in the province.

Areas of the town are dotted with older high-rise residential buildings and hotels, but height limitations on new developments and a significant number of original old town properties have kept the town centre much more open than other popular resorts such as Benidorm and Fuengirola.

As the name Coast of the Sun implies, Torremolinos enjoys one of the best climates in Europe. It has long, dry summers with relatively low humidity, and mild winters with occasional, though heavy, rainfall. The town benefits in the summer from cool sea breezes predominantly coming from Africa, although this does mean a fair amount of Sahara dust. Torremolinos, like San Francisco, sometimes experiences a sea fog that goes as quickly as it appears.

The eastern end of the beach, known as Los Álamos, has live dance music events throughout the summer. The easternmost parts of the beach have kitesurfing and windsurfing except under the flight path of the airport.

In addition to its tourism sector, Torremolinos is known locally for its vibrant and liberal nightlife, particularly its numerous bars and clubs catering to the LGBT community. Torremolinos co-hosted World Pride in 2017 in conjunction with Madrid and holds its own Pride in June, now the third largest in Spain.

History 

Archaeological finds including human bones, tools, and pottery prove that the Torremolinos area was settled as early as the Neolithic Age. Some remnants are neanderthalians and dated 150,000 years old by radiocarbon dating.

According to the Egyptian Greek geographer Ptolemy, the Phoenicians had founded here a colony named Saduce, but the Romans are the most likely to have founded the current town, as shown by findings of edifices and a necropolis (from whose size it has been deduced that the settlement had around 2,000 inhabitants). They also built the road joining Cadiz with Málaga, passing through Torremolinos.

With the Moorish conquest of Spain, the mills, from which the town takes its name (meaning "Tower of the Mills"), were introduced. However, at the time the population was reduced; the tower was built by the Nasrid rulers of Granada starting from 1300. After the fall of Granada, the town remained subject to North African pirate attacks which lasted from the 18th century; during the War of Spanish Succession, the town was attacked by an Anglo-Dutch flotilla under the British admiral George Rooke and almost entirely destroyed. A document dated 1769 lists a town population of 106.

The mills and the city were rebuilt in the early 20th century, but the mill industry started to decline in the 1920s. It was largely replaced by an increasing tourist interest from 1928, particularly British visitors. Hotel Pez Espada opened in 1960. The first gay bar in Spain, Toni's Bar, was founded in Torremolinos in 1962. The Spanish regime reacted to the free lifestyle of the city with arrests of homosexuals and other repressions during the 1970s.

Torremolinos first appeared on the map of the Ensenada's Marques in 1748. 
The name comes from the words Torre (Tower) and Molino (Mill). Water mills covered all this area of which only one survives (Molino de Inca) and one tower which forms part of a restaurant. 
Historians believe that moulded stones discovered at beaches and mountains in Torremolinos indicate the existence of the village 150000 years ago. Further evidence of its pre-history are nine skulls, some bones, clay pots, axe heads and arrows, ornaments of necklaces and bracelets, a ring and some animal bones discovered in the excavations of the caves: cueva del Tesoro (treasure cave), cueva tapada (cover cave), cueva del encanto (charm cave), cueva del tejón (badger cave).
The study of these items places them at the Neolithic in the Quaternary period, around 5.000 years before Christ at the period when man learned to cultivate, the land. It is estimated that the skeletons found at the caves and at the cape of Torremolinos were 1.5 or 1.6 meters tall (4’9 ft. or 5’2 ft.).

Pre-Roman

According to Ptolemy, Phoenicians built the city of Saduce next to Torremolinos. The Romans constructed a road to connect Gades (Cádiz) with Malaca (Málaga).  In the 1990s a Roman necropolis was discovered with 23 graves at the "San Luis build" at Cantabria's square, which confirm the existence of village with 2000 years old.

Middle Ages

Around 1300, the Muslim dynasty of the "Nazríes", which governed Málaga between the 13th and 15th centuries, built the defensive tower that can be seen at the end of San Miguel Street. The tower is 12 meters (39’37 ft.) tall and was built with earth. It is composed of two floors and watch windows to the sea and a terrace.

Before French revolution

After the Christians conquered the kingdom of Granada, Torremolinos was attacked by pirates until the 18th century.

During the War of Spanish succession, an Anglo-Dutch fleet, commanded by the British Admiral George Rooke, looted and burned the houses and mills and destroyed all of Torremolinos. A census of 1769 shows a population of 106 people.

Modern age

During the first half of the 19th century the town was rebuilt and by 1849 there were 14 mills, a fuller mill p Kraft paper and 785 inhabitants. With the demise of the mill, Torremolinos became a small fishing village until the end of the 1950s when it became one of the first tourist centres in the Costa del Sol. 
In the 1950s many celebrities visited Torremolinos such as Grace Kelly, Ava Gardner, Marlon Brando, Orson Welles and Frank Sinatra.

In 1959, the Art Deco styled Pez Espada hotel was opened, the first luxury hotel along the coast. In the following years, new hotels, nightclubs and other tourist-aimed establishments changed the face of the town and its beaches. By 1965, Torremolinos was already consolidated as a major tourist destination.

Climate
Torremolinos has a subtropical Mediterranean climate (Köppen: Csa) with very mild, humid winters and hot, very dry summers. The summers are hot and dry with relatively low humidity, and the winters are mild and humid, especially in November and December, with occasional, though heavy, rainfall. The town benefits in the summer from cool sea breezes predominately coming from Africa although this does mean a fair amount of Sahara dust. In the Summer, Torremolinos sometimes experiences a sea fog that goes as quickly as it appears. The phenomenon, known as 'Taró', was reported as far back as Phoenician times and is a type of sea advection fog.

Shopping

Torremolinos has some very early shopping centres, most of which are sparsely populated. The main tourist shops are on Calle San Miguel and the stairs down to the beach.

British tourists and residents are able to buy some English foods and products at Pepco in Plaza Nogalera, formerly Dealz which is known as Poundland in the UK.

A Carrefour hypermarket is located in a large shopping mall on the A340 towards Benalmadena. Aside from a wide range of International Foods, it also sells electronics, white goods and bicycles. In the area of Plaza Mayor there is an Ikea and several other home furnishing and electrical superstores.  Most of these stores offer low cost delivery services and free parking.

Around town the principle supermarkets are Mercadona, Maskom, Aldi, Lidl, Dia and Supersol. There are many Chinese stores selling almost everything that is made in China. The Carrefour Express supermarket is also open Sundays, unlike most shops.

In 2016, approval was given for a massive shopping, hotel, casino and leisure complex to be built by the same company, Intu, that developed the Trafford Centre in Manchester on land next to Aqualand and the A7 motorway and primary ring roads. Costing in excess of 800 million euros, it will be the largest development of its type in the Mediterranean, incorporating an indoor skydiving attraction, a wave pool, indoor snow skiing, electric go-karting, concert hall and cinemas.  All major Spanish retailers will be present such as El Corte Ingles, Zara and Mango. Construction work began in November 2017 and is expected to be completed within 5 years. Major road works are planned to handle the increased traffic as well as improved transport links to the old town.

As of Summer 2020 the project was on hold following the entering into Administration of INTU PLC. However the partner Eurofund was approached with a view to take over the project. and on 6 November 2020, the President of Eurofund, Ian Sandford, assumed control of the company created to carry out the development of the Intu Costa del Sol shopping and leisure complex. Eurofund had been promoting the development jointly with the British group Intu Properties, but that firm has now filed for bankruptcy.

In November 2021 following a court case brought by the Sociedad Azucarera Larios real estate firm against the developers and Torremolinos town hall, the project has again been delayed by as much as 2 years as the Andalusian Supreme Court has cancelled in its entirety Torremolinos’ current urban development plan (PGOU), in force since 2020. This also affects all new developments. Torremolinos town hall is expected to appeal the decision.

Transport

The coastal towns from Malaga through to Fuengirola are served by Cercanías commuter trains and the fares are divided by zone. One way, all zones normally costs under €5.

Málaga Airport is 10 minutes away by train, which runs every 20 minutes and costs less than €2. It is the 4th busiest airport in Spain carrying over 16 million passengers annually. However, there is no public transport to and from the airport before 6 o'clock in the morning and past midnight. A taxi ride costs approximately €18.

Torremolinos is served by 5 rail stations, all of them wheelchair-friendly including the new refurbished main station in the town centre square of La Nogalera, which now has two escalators and lifts following an investment of €7.5 million.

The ticket machines accept credit cards as well as cash and have multiple languages. In 2019, the paper tickets were replaced by contactless rechargeable cards which cost an initial 50 cents.

From July 2020, Renfe implemented direct access and payment at the turnstile using a contactless bank card. Customers can access the train directly by simply approaching the entrance barrier with a card or on a mobile device, and touching the reading point of the turnstiles without having to purchase a ticket in advance. This can only be used for single journeys and one must "touch out" at their destination in order to avoid being charged the maximum fare.

The air-conditioned and security patrolled trains have toilet facilities, one wheelchair accessible carriage and take push bikes and prams.

There are several Taxi stops, the main one being next to the Nogalera. The normal fare during the day within city limits is under €5 and about €6 minimum at night. The taxis are metered and most accept credit cards. In 2018, UberX was allowed to operate as well as Cabify and Bolt.

The main bus services cover the area along the coast but the local services operate on a circular route which can be very slow. The cost is under €1.50.

There are no paid parking zones in the streets of Torremolinos. Instead, a voluntary system is operated to provide work for those less able. The fee is €1 during working hours without a time limit. One will not be fined for not purchasing or displaying it. There are many underground parking facilities. The beach area is normally free off peak season. Illegally parked cars will be towed and it costs over €100 to recover them.

Famous residents
Danny La Rue, World-famous female impersonator.
Damian Quintero, Karate Champion of the World
Alvin Karpis (1907–1979), Depression-era outlaw, lived his last years in Torremolinos after being released from jail by US authorities.
Gustavo Thorlichen, photographer of the Peróns and Che Guevara.
Nina Zhivanevskaya, bronze medal winner for Spain in 100-metre backstroke at the 2000 Summer Olympics.
Brendan Sheerin, presenter (tour guide) on the British television reality show, Coach Trip.
Miguel Podadera, well known local community member.

References

External links
 Official website
 Sports facilities login
 Official Tourism website

 
Municipalities in the Province of Málaga
Gay villages in Spain
Seaside resorts in Spain